Hillsborough County is the name of two counties in the United States:

Hillsborough County, Florida
Hillsborough County, New Hampshire